Inti Punku or Intipunku (Quechua inti sun, punku door, "sun gate", Hispanicized spellings Intipunco, Intipuncu, Inti Puncu) is an archaeological site in the Cusco Region of Peru that was once a fortress of the sacred city, Machu Picchu. It is now also the name of the final section of the Incan Trail between the Sun Gate complex and the city of Machu Picchu. It was believed that the steps were a control gate for those who enter and exited the Sanctuary.

It is one of the most important archeological constructions around the Machu Picchu site. Inti Punku was once the main entrance to Machu Picchu, in particular it was the primary approach from the then capitol city of Cusco to the southeast. The gate likely would have been protected by Incan military. Inti Punku is dedicated to the cult of the Inti, the Sun god. Because of its location on a ridge southeast of Machu Picchu, the rising sun would pass through the Sun Gate each year on the summer solstice. It is located 2745 meters above the sea level. The altitude of the climb to Inti Punku from Machu Picchu is 290 metres. It is a wide archaeological site with windows and gates that are held up by terraces.  This is the first place that tourists can see the whole sanctuary. Tourists are able to see the sun rise over the whole mountains by Machu Picchu.

Route description 
The route covers a distance of approximately a mile, eventually rising above the ruins of Machu Picchu
The ruins themselves serve as a final stop for hikers completing an optional five-day hike from a point far back from Aguas Calientes, the city at the base of Machu Picchu. This hike has been recommended by many tour guides as giving a great view of the city of Machu Picchu.

In order to get to Inti Punku, the Inca Trail must be trekked, which takes about three to four hours round trip to complete.  There are visible signs throughout the Inca Trail indicating directions of the Sun Gate.  From the Sun Gate, the Machu Picchu Mountain, Huayna Picchu Mountain, Vilcabamba/Urubamba River, and Putukusi Mountain are all visible.

Although the trail to Inti Punku is open all year, there is more rainfall from November to April. Due to the region's unpredictable weather, tourists are advised to be prepared with rain gear and sun protection.

Gallery

See also 
 Patallaqta
 Phuyupatamaka
 Runkuraqay
 Warmiwañusqa
 Willkaraqay

References

External links 

Inca
Archaeological sites in Cusco Region
Archaeological sites in Peru
Tourist attractions in Cusco Region